The 2018 Tour of Antalya was the 1st edition of the Tour of Antalya road cycling stage race. It was part of UCI Europe Tour in category 2.2.

Teams
Twenty-five teams were invited to take part in the race. These included two UCI Professional Continental team, twenty UCI Continental teams and three national teams.

Route

Stages

Stage 1
22 February 2018 — Korkuteli to Korkuteli,

Stage 2
23 February 2018 — Kemer to Kemer,

Stage 3
24 February 2018 — Feslikan to Feslikan,

Stage 4
25 February 2018 — Side to Lara,

Classification leadership table
In the 2018 Tour of Antalya, four different jerseys were awarded for the main classifications. For the general classification, calculated by adding each cyclist's finishing times on each stage, the leader received a pink jersey. This classification was considered the most important of the 2018 Tour of Antalya, and the winner of the classification was considered the winner of the race.

Additionally, there was a points classification, which awarded a yellow jersey. In the points classification, cyclists received points for finishing in the top 5 in a mass-start stage. For winning a stage, a rider earned 5 points, with 4 for second, 3 for third, 2 for fourth and 1 for fifth. Points towards the classification could also be accrued at intermediate sprint points during each stage. The winner of the intermediate sprint earned 5 points, with 4 for second, 3 for third. There was also a mountains classification, the leadership of which was marked by an orange jersey. In the mountains classification, points were won by reaching the top of a climb before other cyclists, with more points available for the higher-categorised climbs. The fourth jersey represented the young rider classification, marked by a white jersey. This was decided in the same way as the general classification, but only riders born after 1 January 1995 were eligible to be ranked in the classification.

External links

References

2018 UCI Europe Tour
2018 in Turkish sport